Jekon Edness (born 13 September 1983) is a Bermudian cricketer.  He is a right-handed batsman and a wicket-keeper. He has played one first-class match for Bermuda to date, against Canada in the 2004 Intercontinental Cup. In the 2006 English cricket season, he played several matches for the Cardiff UCCE team.

References

External links

Cricket Archive profile

1983 births
Living people
Bermudian cricketers
Bermuda One Day International cricketers
Bermuda Twenty20 International cricketers
Wicket-keepers